Herriot is a surname. Notable people with the surname include:

Édouard Herriot (1872–1957), French politician
James Herriot (1916–1995), British veterinary surgeon and writer
Jim Herriot (born 1939), Scottish footballer
John George Herriot (1916–2003), mathematician

Fictional characters:
Zoe Herriot, character in Doctor Who

See also
Heriot (disambiguation)
Herriott